Pierino colpisce ancora (also known as Desirable Teacher 2) is a 1982 comedy film directed by Marino Girolami.

Plot 
Rome: Pierino has again flunked the exams. Therefore, his desperate parents send him to boarding school in Grosseto.

Cast 
Alvaro Vitali: Pierino
Michela Miti: Substitute
Sophia Lombardo: Teacher Mazzacurati
Enzo Robutti: Teacher Pomari
Enzo Liberti:   Pierino's father
Riccardo Billi:   Pierino's grandfather
Toni Ucci: Francesco
Nicoletta Piersanti: Enrichetta
Gianfranco Barra: Teacher 
Serena Grandi: Rosina
Stefania Stella: Waitress

Release
The film was released in Italy on February 23, 1982.

References

External links

1980 films
Italian comedy films
1980 comedy films
Films directed by Marino Girolami
Films scored by Berto Pisano
1982 comedy films
1982 films
Films set in Grosseto
1980s Italian-language films
1980s Italian films